Changshouhu railway station is a railway station located in Changshou District, Chongqing, on the Chongqing–Wanzhou intercity railway operated by China Railway Chengdu Group.

History
The Changshouhu railway station opened on November 28, 2016.

References

Railway stations in Chongqing
Railway stations in China opened in 2016